Colonia Juárez may refer to:

 Colonia Juárez, Mexico City 
 Colonia Juárez, Chihuahua